The women's 100 m at the 2000 Summer Olympics as part of the athletics program were held at the Stadium Australia on 22 September 2000 and 23 September 2000.

The top three runners in each of the initial ten heats automatically qualified for the second round. The next two fastest runners from across the heats also qualified for the second round. The top four runners in each of the four second round heats automatically qualified for the semi-final.

The gold medal was originally won by Marion Jones of the United States. However, on 5 October 2007, she admitted to having used performance-enhancing drugs prior to the 2000 Olympics. On 9 October she relinquished her medals to the United States Olympic Committee, and on 12 December the International Olympic Committee formally stripped her of her medals.

The IOC did not initially decide to regrade the results, as silver medalist Ekaterini Thanou had herself been subsequently involved in a doping scandal in the run-up to the 2004 Summer Olympics. After two years of deliberation, in late 2009 the IOC decided to upgrade Lawrence and Ottey to silver and bronze respectively, and leave Thanou as a silver medallist, with the gold medal withheld.

Records
Prior to this competition, the existing world and Olympic records were as follows:

No new world or Olympic records were set for this event.

Results

Heats

The heats were held on Friday, 22 September 2000.

Heat 1

Heat 2

Heat 3

Heat 4

Heat 5

Heat 6

Heat 7

Heat 8

Heat 9

Heat 10

Quarterfinals

The quarterfinals were held on Friday, 22 September 2000.

Quarterfinal 1

Quarterfinal 2

Quarterfinal 3

Quarterfinal 4

Semifinals

The semifinals were held on Saturday, 23 September 2000.

Semifinal 1

Semifinal 2

Final

The final was held on Saturday, 23 September 2000.

Note: Thanou not awarded gold medal

Results summary

Overall results for heats

Overall results for quarterfinals

Overall results for semifinals

See also
1998 European Athletics Championships – Women's 100 metres
 1999 World Championships in Athletics - Women's 100 metres
 2001 World Championships in Athletics - Women's 100 metres
 2002 European Athletics Championships – Women's 100 metres

References

External links
 Results
 Official Report of the 2000 Sydney Summer Olympics

 
100 metres at the Olympics
2000 in women's athletics
Women's events at the 2000 Summer Olympics